The men's 4 × 100 metre medley relay event at the 2008 Olympic Games took place on 15 and 17 August at the Beijing National Aquatics Center in Beijing, China.

Since the event's inception in 1960, the U.S. men's team dominated the race from the start to demolish a new world record, to defend their title, and most importantly, to wrap up the greatest performance in Olympic history for Michael Phelps. Joining Aaron Peirsol (53.16), Brendan Hansen (59.37), and Jason Lezak (46.76), Phelps delivered a butterfly split of 50.15 to maintain a leading pace and claim a historic gold for the Americans with a world-record time of 3:29.34, shaving 1.34 seconds off their standard from Athens in 2004. By capturing his eighth gold, Phelps also eclipsed Mark Spitz's 1972 record of seven for the most in a single Games, raising his career total to 16 medals (14 golds and 2 bronze).

The Aussie foursome of Hayden Stoeckel (53.80), Brenton Rickard (58.56), Andrew Lauterstein (51.03), and Eamon Sullivan (46.65) trailed behind their greatest rivals in the pool by exactly seven-tenths of a second (0.70), but took home an admirable silver in an Oceanian record of 3:30.04. Meanwhile, Japan's Kosuke Kitajima fueled the field on the breaststroke leg with a terrific split of 58.07 to deliver the foursome of  Junichi Miyashita (53.87), Takuro Fujii (50.89), and Hisayoshi Sato (48.35) a bronze-medal time in 3:31.18, worthy enough for an Asian record.

Russia's Arkady Vyatchanin (53.36), Roman Sloudnov (59.45), Yevgeny Korotyshkin (51.62), and Yevgeny Lagunov (47.49) missed the podium by almost three-fourths of a second (0.75) with a fourth-place effort in 3:31.92, while Daniel Bell (54.52), Glenn Snyders (59.46), Corney Swanepoel (52.12), and Cameron Gibson (47.99) established a New Zealand record of 3:33.39 to claim the fifth spot in the final, holding off the British quartet of Liam Tancock (54.69), Chris Cook (59.65), Michael Rock (52.02), and Simon Burnett (47.33) by 0.30 seconds, a national record of 3:33.69. South Africa's Gerhard Zandberg (54.69), Cameron van der Burgh (59.40), Lyndon Ferns (51.39), and Darian Townsend (48.22) finished closer to the Brits by a hundredth of a second (0.01) with a seventh-place time of 3:33.70. As the entire field came to a dramatic finish in the pool, Italy was disqualified from the race because of an early relay takeoff on the final exchange by freestyle anchor Filippo Magnini.

Records
Prior to this competition, the existing world and Olympic records were as follows.

The following new world and Olympic records were set during this competition.

Results

Heats

Final

References

External links
Official Olympic Report

Men's medley relay 4 x 100 metre
4 × 100 metre medley relay
Men's events at the 2008 Summer Olympics